is a Japanese dark fantasy manga series written and illustrated by Seita Horio. It was serialized in Kodansha's Monthly Morning Two magazine from May 2008 to September 2015, with its chapters collected into eight tankōbon volumes. The manga tells the story of Juri Yukawa, who during a kidnapping of her nephew and brother, discovered that her grandfather can stop time using a mysterious stone and that they can move freely when time is standing still.

In North America, the manga is licensed by Kodansha USA. A 12-episode anime television series adaptation produced by Geno Studio was broadcast from January to March 2018 on Tokyo MX and BS11. Amazon Video exclusively streamed the series worldwide.

Story
Juri Yukawa is a mischievous young woman, unaware that her family has the secret ability to stop time. When her brother and nephew are suddenly kidnapped by a cult named the "Genuine Love Society", her grandfather uses a special stone that allows her and her father to enter a world called Stasis, where time stands still. As they venture through Stasis to infiltrate the cult's hideout, they meet others who can also move through the mysterious world, as well as the strange grotesque monsters that reside in it. Juri herself will discover the secrets behind the stone and Stasis itself, as they slowly unfold before her.

Characters

An unemployed young woman who has failed 19 job interviews in a row, struggling to stay positive as her family is breaking down. She discovers that she has the power to expel Specters from the bodies of those who can move through Stasis by simply slamming them with the palm of her hand.

A mysterious woman who has led several members of the Genuine Love Society into Stasis, but secretly harbors her own plans to find her missing family.

Juri's grandfather who holds the original magic stone that allows himself and anyone nearby to merge with Specters and travel through Stasis. He can also teleport himself and anyone he touches, but only in short distances.

The leader of the Genuine Love Society who seeks to learn everything he can about the world of Stasis to use it for his own ends.

Juri's slovenly father who was recently laid off from his job.

Juri's brother and a NEET who wastes his days playing video games at home. Ends up getting kidnapped while bringing Makoto home from kindergarten. In Stasis, he decides to take care of Makoto so the boy won't follow the same path he did.

An innocent young boy and the nephew of Juri and Tsubasa. Later revealed to be able to control the Handlers with his mind.

Junji's right-hand man.

One of the henchmen for the Genuine Love Society who decides to stick with Shoko. Unlike the other members of the cult, he is only there to do a job and does not follow Sagawa's beliefs.

Shoko's younger brother, who became a Handler 17 years ago. When he and his parents were rescued, he is the only one who survived.

Media

Manga
Kokkoku: Moment by Moment is written and illustrated by Seita Horio. It was serialized in Kodansha's Monthly Morning Two magazine from 22 May 2008 to 22 September 2014. Kodansha collected its chapters into eight tankōbon volumes, released from 21 August 2009 to 23 October 2014.

Kodansha USA has licensed the manga in North America for digital release.

Volume list

Anime
An anime television series adaptation by Geno Studio was announced to be in development as one of the studio's three major anime projects in October 2017. It is directed by Yoshimitsu Ohashi and written by Noboru Kimura, with character designs by Yasuomi Umetsu. The anime ran on the Tokyo MX and BS11 stations in Japan from 7 January to 25 March 2018.

Amazon Video exclusively streamed the series worldwide. Sentai Filmworks have licensed the series for a home video release with an English dub on 16 April 2019. Anime Limited acquired the series for distribution in the United Kingdom and Ireland.

Episode list

See also
Golden Gold, another manga series by the same author

Note

References

External links
 
 

Anime series based on manga
Dark fantasy anime and manga
Kodansha manga
Mystery anime and manga
Seinen manga
Sentai Filmworks
Science fiction anime and manga
Supernatural thriller anime and manga